The 2017 World Judo Open Championships were held in Marrakesh, Morocco, from 11 to 12 November 2017.

Medal overview

Men's events

Women's events

Medals table

Tournament results

Men's event

Finals

Repechage

Top Draw

Bottom Draw

Women's event

Repechage

Main Draw

Prize money
The sums written are per medalist, bringing the total prizes awarded to 500,000€.

References

External links
 
 World Open Championships

World
O
Judo
2017 in Moroccan sport
21st century in Marrakesh
Sports competitions in Marrakesh
Judo